Hiroshi Ito or Hiroshi Itō may refer to:
  (born 1933), voice actor born in Fukuoka Prefecture, Japan
 Hiroshi Itō, IBM Fellow and co-inventor of chemically amplified photoresists